Johnny McClanian Best, Jr. (October 20, 1913, Shelby, North Carolina – September 19, 2003) was an American jazz trumpeter.

Background

Best played piano as a child and learned trumpet from age 13. He worked in the 1930s with Les Brown, Charlie Barnet, and Artie Shaw (1937–39), then joined Glenn Miller's orchestra from 1939 to 1942. He spent a short time with Bob Crosby before serving in the Navy during World War II as a lifeguard, playing in Shaw's military band in 1942-43 and Sam Donahue's in 1944-45. Following a stint with Benny Goodman in 1945-46, he relocated to Hollywood, where he worked with Crosby again on radio from 1946–51 and played in many studio big bands in the 1940s and 1950s. He did a tour with Billy May in 1953, and led his own group locally later in the decade. His trumpet can be heard along with Ella Fitzgerald on her album Get Happy.  In 1964 he toured Japan with Crosby, and joined Ray Conniff for worldwide tours in the 1970s. In 1982, he broke his back while working in his avocado orchard and used a wheelchair late in life, but was active into the 1980s.

He played the trumpet solo on the Glenn Miller recording of "At Last", which was featured in the film Orchestra Wives, lip-synched by George Montgomery on screen.

Billy May recalled: “He had a good sound on the instrument. Playing the trumpet can be an endurance contest with your lip, and Johnny had command. He played on ‘Begin the Beguin (sic),’ which put Artie Shaw in business.”

References

Further reading
Brian Peerless, "Johnny Best". The New Grove Dictionary of Jazz.

External links

Johnny Best Interview NAMM Oral History Library (1995)
 Johnny Best recordings at the Discography of American Historical Recordings.

1913 births
2003 deaths
American jazz trombonists
Male trombonists
American jazz trumpeters
American male trumpeters
People from Shelby, North Carolina
20th-century American musicians
20th-century trumpeters
20th-century trombonists
Jazz musicians from North Carolina
20th-century American male musicians
American male jazz musicians
Glenn Miller Orchestra members